Lindsey Takara Doe (born ) is a sexologist, sex educator, and host of Sexplanations on YouTube.

Personal life
, she had three non-biological children: a five-year-old foster son and two teenaged daughters. Their lack of sex education drove Doe to create Sexplanations. In 2015, when one of her daughters complained about a boy who would not stop pestering her for a date, Doe took the opportunity and published a video addressing such harassment from boys; the video received international attention, spirited debate, and over 76,000 views in ten days.

In 2010, Doe's photograph was featured alongside a personal statement as part of The Strong Women Project, exhibited at the Maureen and Mike Mansfield Library in Missoula, Montana.  She was originally photographed "in a pressed collared shirt, slacks and matching jewelry", but felt she was misrepresenting herself; Doe returned to the shoot hours later, stripped to her underwear, and slathered herself in homemade mud to retake the photos.

In 2022, Doe posted to Twitter that she had moved to Slovenia.

Education
For her Master of Science at the University of Montana (UM) in 2005, Doe's thesis was Phenomenological claim of first sexual intercourse among individuals of varied levels of sexual self-disclosure.  She received her Doctor of Philosophy in human sexuality from the then-accredited Institute for Advanced Study of Human Sexuality.

Career
A self-described sexologist, by February 2008, Doe had an office in Missoula—the city's first, helping clients with sexuality difficulties.  In 2015, her sexual health center was Birds and Bees LLC.

She was also an adjunct professor at UM, teaching on human sexuality, from 2006–2014.  After her departure from the school due to budget cuts, enrollment numbers in the human-sexuality course dropped by half, and by the 2017–2018 academic year, the course was gone altogether.  In autumn 2014, she was traveling across the United States and giving one-hour college lectures on sexual health.

Sexplanations

In April 2013, Doe partnered with Hank Green to found the YouTube channel Sexplanations, a series about human sexuality that began that July.  By October 2013, the videos had already attracted controversy and attacks on its host; viewers have objected to Doe's use of the phrases "biosex male" and "biosex female" to refer to sex assignment, as well as her inclusion of "allies" in the initialism LGBTIQQAA2.  The ratio of filmed content to the final videos is about 30:1, with Doe and her videographer agonizing over all the details.  Guests on Sexplanations have included Eden Atwood and Hank Green.  The show's tagline is "stay curious".  In 2015, The Daily Dot raved about Sexplanations, calling it "not only an accomplishment in the world of sex education but the world of YouTube."  In June 2017, Doe expanded the Sexplanations brand to a similarly-themed podcast.

In November 2021, Doe announced the December retirement of Sexplanations, citing two primary reasons: first, an observation that she was finding her content repetitive, and second, that her mental health had declined from nearly a decade of persistent sexual harassment and vitriolic emails and calls to her personal cell phone.

References

External links
 
 
 
 

1980s births
educational and science YouTubers
expatriates in Slovenia
living people
people from Missoula, Montana
sex educators
University of Montana alumni
University of Montana faculty
women sexologists
women video bloggers